Tsukamurella is a Gram-positive, non-spore-forming, rod-shaped and obligate aerobic bacterial genus from the family of Tsukamurellaceae. Most of the strains of Tsukamurella degrade starch. Some Tsukamurella species can cause infections in humans.

References

Further reading 
 
 

Mycobacteriales
Bacteria genera